Balach (بالآچ) is a Baloch first name for males.

A notable person named Balach is Balach Marri of Balochistan, Pakistan, who was a tribal chief, politician and a freedom fighter, born in 1966.

Masculine given names
Balochi-language surnames